Imma bilineella is a moth in the family Immidae. It was described by Snellen in 1885. It is found on Sulawesi, the Sangihe Islands, Buru and the Bismarck Archipelago.

The wingspan is 21–23 mm. The forewings are clay grey-brown with two ochreous yellow transverse lines. The hindwings are dark grey.

References

Moths described in 1885
Immidae
Moths of Oceania